The  is a funfair in Germany, located near the Rhine–Herne Canal in  in the city of Herne located in Metro Ruhr. It is the biggest funfair in the state of North Rhine-Westphalia and the second biggest fair in Germany, only behind the Munich Oktoberfest. In 2008 there were 4.7 million visitors. At an area of only  and 500 show businesses it is called the "most overcrowded fair of the world".

The fair is held annually for a period of 10 days from the first Friday in August. Visitor attractions include Ferris wheels, carousels, roller coasters, ghost trains, carnival games, food stalls, raffles and beer halls and gardens. On opening and closing day a fireworks show is presented.

History
The exact year of the first fair is unknown. During the 15th century a market to sell wild horses from the nearby riparian forests of the Emscher was established in Crange to be held around St Lawrence's Day, 10 August. Over the years, dancers, prestidigitators, jugglers, fortune tellers, magicians and carnies joined and gradually outnumbered the horse dealers. When industrialisation and mining in the Ruhr district led to a substantial population increase in the area, annual visitor numbers to the Cranger Kirmes grew to about 4 million now.
The horse market of the Cranger Kirmes takes place each year on the Thursday before the fair.

Due to COVID-19 restrictions, there was no fair in 2020.

References

External links 

Official Cranger Kirmes website

Annual fairs
Herne, North Rhine-Westphalia
Festivals in Germany
Fairs in Germany
Horse trade